Cápac Yupanqui (Quechua Qhapaq Yupanki Inka, "splendid accountant Inca") was the fifth Sapa Inca of the Kingdom of Cusco (beginning around CE 1320) and the last of the Hurin dynasty.

Family 
Yupanqui was a son and successor of Mayta Cápac while his elder brother Cunti Mayta became high priest.

His chief wife was Mama Cusi Hilpay (or Qorihillpay or Ccuri-hilpay), the daughter of the lord of Anta, previously a great enemy of the Incas.

His son with a woman called Cusi Chimbo, founder of the Hanan dynasty, was Inca Roca.

Reign 
In legend, Yupanqui is a great conqueror; the chronicler Juan de Betanzos says that he was the first Inca to conquer territory outside the valley of Cuzco—which may be taken to delimit the importance of his predecessors.

He subjugated the Cuyumarca and Ancasmarca.  His sons from other women included Apu Calla, Humpi, Apu Saca, Apu Chima-chaui, Apu Urco Huaranca, and Uchun-cuna-ascalla-rando.  He died in 1350.

Garcilaso de la Vega reports that he improved the city of Cuzco with many buildings, bridges, roads and aqueducts.

References 

Year of birth unknown
Inca emperors
14th-century deaths
14th-century monarchs in South America